Colin Harrington (born 3 April 1943) is an English former footballer who played for Oxford United, Wolverhampton Wanderers, Mansfield Town and Kettering Town. During his spell at Oxford, he played 234 league games. After leaving Oxford United, Harrington moved to Mansfield Town where he was signed to Kettering Town by Ron Atkinson.

References

External links
Rage Online profile

1943 births
English footballers
Association football midfielders
Wolverhampton Wanderers F.C. players
Oxford United F.C. players
Mansfield Town F.C. players
Kettering Town F.C. players
English Football League players
Living people